Fukuoka is a 2020 South Korean drama film written and directed by Korean-Chinese filmmaker Zhang Lü and stars Kwon Hae-hyo, Yoon Je-moon and Park So-dam.

It premiered at the 70th Berlin International Film Festival in February 2020.

Plot
Je-moon and Hae-hyo were good friends in college but fell out after falling in love with the same girl, Soon-yi. Now 28 years later and approaching middle age, his memory of his college days starts to haunt him frequently. One day, a strange girl, So-dam, appears and urges him to look for Hae-hyo, who lives in Japan.

Cast
Kwon Hae-hyo as Hae-hyo
Yoon Je-moon as Je-moon
Park So-dam as So-dam
Yamamoto Yuki as Yuki

References

External links

 

2020 films
2020s Korean-language films
2020 drama films
South Korean drama films
Films directed by Zhang Lu
Films set in Fukuoka
Films shot in Fukuoka